The Argentine Athletics Confederation (CADA; Confederación Argentina de Atletismo) is the national governing body for the sport of athletics in Argentina. Current president is Juan Alberto Scarpín.  He took office in September 2008 after the death of former president Hugo La Nasa, and was elected in April 2009 for the period 2009-2013.

History 
CADA was founded on September 19, 1954.  It replaced the Federación Atlética
Argentina, which was founded on July 4, 1919. The latter followed the
Fundación Pedestre Argentina, which was founded on February 13, 1911, and was founder member of the CONSUDATLE on May 24, 1918, in Buenos Aires.

Affiliations 
CADA is the national member federation for Argentina in the following international organisations:
World Athletics
Confederación Sudamericana de Atletismo (CONSUDATLE; South American Athletics Confederation)
Association of Panamerican Athletics (APA)
Asociación Iberoamericana de Atletismo (AIA; Ibero-American Athletics Association)
Moreover, it is part of the following national organisations:
Comité Olímpico Argentino

Member federations 

CADA comprises the athletics federations of the Argentinian provinces.

National records 
CADA maintains the Argentine records in athletics.

External links

References 

Athletics
Argentina
Athletics in Argentina
National governing bodies for athletics
Sports organizations established in 1954